James Ivy Richardson II (born March 3, 1976), known professionally as J. Ivy, is an American performance poet, spoken word artist, songwriter, and author. He won his first Grammy Award in 2023 with his sixth album, The Poet Who Sat By The Door.

J. Ivy is a three-time HBO Def Poet and is known for his performance on Kanye West’s Grammy Award winning debut album The College Dropout, which featured him on the song "Never Let Me Down" along with Jay-Z. He received an NAACP Image Award for his writing and on-camera narration of the BET documentary Muhammad Ali: The People's Champ.

Early life
J. Ivy was born March 3, 1976 as James Ivy Richardson II in Chicago, Illinois to James Ivy Richardson Sr. and Pamela Richardson.  His father was a Disc Jockey and On-Air Personality, who went by the name Jim Richards. Jim Richards' highlights included hosting the morning hour show on Chicago's popular radio station WVON, and his mother was a registered nurse.

J. Ivy grew up on Chicago's South side with his family until the age of 14 before moving to the South Suburbs of Chicago, where he attended Rich Central High School.  Ivy discovered his poetry talent during his junior year when his English teacher asked him to perform a piece he had written for a routine homework assignment. He performed in front of the student body and received a standing ovation. J. was heavily influenced by his mother, who supported his budding talent by encouraging him to continue writing and publish his burgeoning body of work. After his successful school performance, J took his poetry passion as a serious hobby and began regularly writing and performing well into his college years.

Music career
J. Ivy attended Illinois State University, where he became known on campus as "The Poet" and delved deeper into the art form.  After college, J. Ivy returned to Chicago and frequently performed on the local arts circuit.  As his popularity grew, J. Ivy was featured several times on Chicago's WGCI radio station and later became the host of "Rituals," (from 1997 to 2000) the most popular poetry night in Chicago and perhaps the nation at that time. He was eventually asked to come on Russell Simmons' HBO Def Poetry Jam. He received a standing ovation for his performance of "I Need to Write" and was invited back for two encore appearances in later seasons where he performed his signature poems "Dear Father" and "Never Let Me Down."

Fellow Chicagoan Kanye West heard about J. Ivy from mutual friends while he was working on his debut album The College Dropout for Roc-A-Fella Records.  He contacted Ivy and offered him the opportunity to be on the song, "Never Let Me Down" which also featured Jay-Z.  The College Dropout album earned a Grammy Award for Best Rap Album. The night J. Ivy recorded his verse on "Never Let Me Down," he heard music from a singer named John Stephens. J. Ivy was so inspired by John's music that he began to call him John Legend. J. Ivy is also featured in the first episode of the Kanye three part documentary Jeen-yuhs.

His distinct hip-hop poetic style caught the attention of many who were not accustomed to hearing poetry incorporated into music in this manner which led him to collaborating with many artists including John Legend, Estelle, Slum Village, Maurice Brown, Smoke DZA, and more.
On October 26, 2010, J. Ivy released his second studio album "HERE I AM", which features guest artists Abiodun Oyewole of The Last Poets, Jessica Care Moore, Jesse Boykins III, Blitz the Ambassador, Chris Rob, Amanda Seales, Mikkey Halsted, and more.

In 2014 J. Ivy released a mixtape titled, "Diggin' in the Papes Vol.1", which features a host of collaborative records Ivy has created with Hip-Hop artist and producers like Crooked I, The Cool Kids, Ski Beatz, Slum Village, Carl Thomas, Tall Black Guy, and more.

In 2017 J. Ivy released his third studio album, "My Daddy's Records", an album created for his book "Dear Father: Breaking the Cycle of Pain."

J. Ivy is currently the Chicago Chapter President of the Recording Academy and is the first Spoken-Word Artist to hold a Chapter President seat in the history of the Recording Academy.

Literary career
In 2012, J. Ivy followed up his album "HERE I AM" with the release of his book "HERE I AM: Then & Now," a compilation of the album's lyrics, stories regarding the inspiration for the album, and additional poetry. In January 2014 J. Ivy inked a book deal with Beyond Words Publishing, an imprint of Atria Books & Simon & Schuster, for the January 2015 release of his new book "Dear Father: Breaking the Cycle of Pain", which is based on J. Ivy's poem "Dear Father" (as seen on HBO Def Poetry).

Ad campaigns
In addition to his voice, Ivy has been a featured in numerous ads and served as a spokesperson for national corporate initiatives.  He has been a model for both Mecca and LRG’s national print-ads as well as a spokesperson for Ford Urban.com alongside Tarrey Torae, Rocsi from BET's 106 & Park and MTV’s VJ Sway Calloway.

Voice overs
J. Ivy was the sole voice and face in Verizon’s History in the Making Campaign, which earned him a Gold Clio Award for the campaign's commercial, which was shown in movie theaters nationwide. This campaign was directed by Bob Giraldi, who directed Michael Jackson's "Beat It." J. Ivy's musical endorsements have also included extensive work with Allstate Insurance’s Beyond February initiative. J. Ivy's voice has also been heard on 2013 Benjamin Moore & Co. Paint Commercial, 2013–15 Nissan Commercials, HBO Boxing, Monday Night Football, CBS Sports, MTV’s Who's Got Game, and in the 2009 and 2011 NFL seasons, he was featured on the introduction for the entire season of NBC’s Sunday Night Football alongside Faith Hill.

Charity and community involvement
J. Ivy supports programs that bring arts into the school system.  He is a regular performer in Chicago Public Schools. J. Ivy was a guest speaker/performer at Deepak Chopra's 2012 Annual Sages & Scientists Symposium and was the official MC for the 2013 & 2014 edition. Additionally, J. Ivy has conducted poetry workshops and given performances for Reading Is Fundamental, The Kanye West Foundation, and Steve Harvey's Mentoring Camp For Young Men, where he presented his Dear Father Initiative, which teaches the power of forgiveness and promotes social emotional healing through the exercise of writing and journaling.

Film and television appearances
J. Ivy has appeared on many programs and series, including: ER, The Martha Stewart Show, ABC's BCS Selection Show, ABC's All-America Team Show, ABC's FedEx Orange Bowl Championship Game, ABC's Monday Night Football, ABC's NBA Finals, Russell Simmons' Def Poetry Jam on HBO, HBO's Bob Costas Now, HBO Boxing, MTV's Who's Got Game, MTV's 2004 New Year's Eve Bash (2004), MTV's Black History Month Special (2004), MTV's My Block, VH-1's Best Year Ever (2005), B.E.T.'s Lyric Café, BET's Black Carpet Series, B.E.T.'s Harlem Nights, the independent film, Backstabbers (1999), ESPN's 2015 Scripps National Spelling Bee, and B.E.T.'s "Ali: The People's Champ, which won a NAACP Image Award. In 2018 Ivy's national T.V. commercial for AARP premiered on Super Bowl Sunday during the episode of NBC's This Is Us and has run through 2019. In January of 2019 J. Ivy wrote for, starred in, and narrated B.E.T.'s documentary "Martin: The Legacy of a King." He was also featured in Episode 1 of AMC's  "Hip-Hop: The Songs that Shook America."

Personal life
After dating for six years, J. Ivy married singer-songwriter Tarrey Torae, on September 4, 2005, in Chicago, Illinois.

Awards and nominations

Discography

Studio albums
 Here I Am (2010)
 My Daddy's Records (2017)
 Catching Dreams (2020)
 The Poet who sat by the Door (2022)

Live albums
 Catching Dreams: Live at Fort Knox Chicago (2021)

The Poet Who Sat by the Door
The Poet Who Sat By The Door is the sixth album of American poet, spoken word artist, actor and songwriter J. Ivy. It was released on September 30, 2022, by Word & Soul, LLC. The album won a Grammy in the category of Best Spoken Word Poetry Album in 2023. The album features collaborations with artists such as multi-award winning singer and songwriter John Legend, rapper Slick Rick The Ruler, PJ Morton, Ledisi, Sir the Baptist, Deon Cole, singer-songwriter and co-executive producer Tarrey Torae, BJ the Chicago Kid, Ursula Rucker, Omari Hardwick, Yaw, Musiq Soulchild, Sunni Patterson, Verse, and Abiodun Oyewole. Ivy made The Poet Who Sat By The Door to promote his art form of poetry and the spoken word. The album's music and messages include recurring themes of endurance, love, passion, oppression, inspiration, faith and healing.

In an studio interview on WGN Channel 9's live morning show, Daytime Chicago, Ivy explains how he recorded The Poet Who Sat By The Door in two months after spending two years working on Emmy nominated Netflix documentary jeen-yuhs: A Kanye West Trilogy, and while leading the push for the new Best Spoken Word Poetry Album category with the Recording Academy. Ivy also tells the story of how he gave John Stephens (a.k.a. John Legend) his stage name.

Executive Producers: J. Ivy, Tarrey Torae, Harvey Mason Jr., Sir the Baptist, Juan Woodbury. Album Producers: J. Ivy, Tarrey Torae, Sir the Baptist, Juan Woodbury, Om’Mas Keith, Maurice Brown, Marshall Knights  Producers: J. Ivy, Tarrey Torae, Greg “G Ball” Magers, Sir the Baptist, Prof. Larry Jenkins, Xcelence, Maurice Brown, Seauxgood, Tensei, Bryan Abraham, Kris Myers, Nicole Neely, JT Rich, Marshall Knights, PJ Morton, Juan Woodbury aka Mr. Takumoto, Daniel Haney Brunelle, Om’Mas Keith.  Associate Producer: Ken Rose. Engineers: Greg “G Ball” Magers, Joshua Keith, Claudio Barrella, Eric Bogacz, Eric Lau, Jason Cesario, Kenta Yonesaka, Scott “Robot Scott” Carter, Izzy San, Ty Caughell, Rex Rideout. Mixers: Greg “G Ball” Magers mixed the entire album with exception of Vibrations II, which was mixed by Eric Lau and Greg Magers. Additional mixing by Ryan Hewitt. Songwriters: James Ivy Richardson II, Tarrey Torae Richardson, Sir William Baptist, Abiodun Oyewole, John Stephens, Ricky M.L. Walters, Zebadiah Anderson, Derrick Chambers Logan, Ursula Rucker, Omari Hardwick, Bryan Sledge, Taalib Hassan Johnson, Ledisi.

Record Label: Word & Soul, LLC.

The official release date of The Poet Who Sat By The Door is September 30, 2022.

References

External links
Screamingwoman.com
Rogerroberts.net
Official website

American spoken word artists
Writers from Chicago
1976 births
Living people
Grammy Award winners